This is a list of Dakar Rally fatal accidents involving both competitors and non-competitors who have died during a Dakar Rally event.

Since 1979, 78 people are known to have died as a result of the Dakar rally. Among the 32 competitor fatalities, 23 were motorcycle related, 6 car related, 1 truck related, and 2 competitors died as a result of local rebel conflict. Up to 1992, collision was the most common cause of death among competitors.

Among the 46 non-competitor fatalities are those of the race's founder Thierry Sabine, 14 news journalists and support crew, 23 spectators, and 4 children.

The Dakar Rally has received criticism because of its high mortality rates, with the Vatican Paper describing the event as "the bloody race of irresponsibility". The event received particular criticism in the 1988 race, when three Africans were killed in collisions with vehicles involved in the race. PANA, a Dakar-based news agency, wrote that the deaths were "insignificant for the [race's] organizers". The Dakar organizers have not officially recorded or reported on African and Latin American spectator and innocent bystanders deaths. As a result, fatality numbers for the Dakar vary from source to source, and bystander victims usually remain unnamed.

List of fatal accidents involving competitors

List of fatal accidents involving non-competitors

References

Dakar
fatal accidents